Codex Vaticanus 2066, designed by 046 (in the Gregory-Aland numbering), α 1070 (von Soden), formerly it was known also as Codex Basilianus, previously it was designated by Br or B2. It is a Greek uncial manuscript of the New Testament written on vellum. The manuscript paleographically has been assigned to the 10th century by the INTF, though some palaeographers proposed the 9th century. Scrivener proposed even the 8th century.

Description 

The codex contains the complete text of the Book of Revelation on 20 parchment leaves (27.5 cm by 19 cm), along with much non-biblical material (homilies of Basil the Great, Gregory of Nyssa and others).

The text is written in one column per page, 35 lines per page, in about 36 letters per line. The uncial letter of the codex are written in a peculiar form with special attention. "The uncials being of a peculiar kind, leaning a little to the right; they hold a sort of middle place between square and oblong characters.... The breathings and accents are primâ manu, and pretty correct..."

Text 

The Greek text of this codex is a representative of the Byzantine text-type, in a close relationship to the minuscules 61 and 69. Aland placed it in Category V.

Uncial 046 is the earliest manuscript which represented the main Byzantine group ("a").

Textual variants
Some textual variants: 
 Rev 1:5
 λύσαντι ἡμᾶς ἐκ (freed us from) — P18, אc, A, C, 2020, 2081, 2814
 λούσαντι ἡμᾶς ἀπο (washed us from) — P, 046, 94, 1006, 1859, 2042, 2065, 2073, 2138, 2432

 Rev 1:6
 βασιλειαν (kingdom) — א A 046 1854 2050 2351
 βασιλεις (kings) — P, ByzA

 Rev 4:8
 ἅγιος ἅγιος ἅγιος] A Byz ς WH
 ἅγιος ἅγιος ἅγιος ἅγιος ἅγιος ἅγιος ἅγιος ἅγιος ἅγιος] (‭א) al 046

 Rev 5:4
 καὶ (and) —  ‭א P 1611text 2053 2081 2344 2814
 καὶ ἐγὼ (and I) — 046 94 1006 1611mg 1859 2020 2042 2065 2073 2432

 Rev 8:8
 ορος μεγα καιομενον

 Rev 22:14
 ποιουντες τας εντολας αυτου (those who do His commandments) — 046, 94, 1611, 1854, 1859, 2042, 2065, 2073, 2138, 2432, 2814
 πλυνοντες τας στολας αυτων (those who wash their robes) — א, A, 1006, 2020, 2053

History 

The manuscript once belonged to Philippo Vitali (1590–1653). It was described by Bianchini.

According to Scrivener it was written in the 8th century.

The text of the codex was published by a Cardinal Angelo Mai in 1859 in Rome. It was examined by Tischendorf and Tregelles.

The codex is located now in the Vatican Library (Gr. 2066) in Rome.

See also 

 List of New Testament uncials
 Textual criticism
 Codex Vaticanus 2061

References

Further reading 

 Constantin von Tischendorf, Monumenta sacra inedita (Leipzig 1846), pp. 407–431. 
 Angelo Mai, Novum Testamentum Graece ex antiquissimo Codice Vaticano (Rome, 1859). 
 Giuseppe Cozza-Luzi, Ad editionem Apocalypseos s. Johannis… Lipsiae anno 1869 evulgatam animadversionesa (Rome, 1869).
 Pierre Batiffol, "L'Abbaye de Rossano" (Paris, 1891), pp. 63.
 C. R. Gregory, Textkritik des Neuen Testamentes III (Leipzig: 1909), pp. 1046–1047.

External links 
 R. Waltz, Codex Vaticanus 2066 (Uncial 046): at the Encyclopedia of Textual Criticism

Greek New Testament uncials
10th-century biblical manuscripts
Manuscripts of the Vatican Library